Reid Glacier is an 11-mile-long (18 km) glacier in the U.S. state of Alaska. It trends north to Reid Inlet in Glacier Bay National Park and Preserve, two miles (3 km) south of Glacier Bay and 72 miles (116 km) northwest of Hoonah. It was named by members of the Harriman Alaska Expedition for Harry Fielding Reid.

See also
 List of glaciers

Cited references

Glaciers of Glacier Bay National Park and Preserve
Glaciers of Hoonah–Angoon Census Area, Alaska
Glaciers of Unorganized Borough, Alaska